Win Hands Down is the seventh studio album by American heavy metal band Armored Saint. It was released on June 2, 2015. The vocals were recorded at Bridge Recording in Los Angeles, guitars and bass were recorded at Travis Dickerson Studios in Chatsworth and drums were recorded at Clearlake Audio in Burbank.

Two videos have been released for the album: the title track and the song "An Exercise in Debauchery". The band toured extensively in summer 2015 with Saxon in support of the album.

Critical reception
Metal.de rated the album 9 out of 10 points. Marek Protzak wrote, there was "no other band at the moment" who played "classical metal in such an inspired and versed manner". German Rock Hard magazine editors voted Win Hands Down as "Album of the Month". Editor-in-chief Boris Kaiser called Armored Saint "one of the most underrated bands in US Metal" and compared the album to 1991's Symbol of Salvation. He rated it 8.5 of 10.

Commercial performance
The album sold double the number of copies as the previous album La Raza.

Track listing

Personnel
Band Members
 John Bush – lead vocals
 Phil Sandoval – lead guitar
 Jeff Duncan – lead guitar
 Joey Vera – bass, backing vocals 
 Gonzo Sandoval – drums

Additional musician
 Pearl Aday – guest vocals on "With a Full Head of Steam"

Production
Joey Vera – production, engineering
Jay Ruston – drum engineering, mixing
Josh Newall – drum engineering

Charts

References

2015 albums
Armored Saint albums
Metal Blade Records albums